Keshar-e Dustani (also Romanized as Keshār-e Dūstānī) is a village in Kohurestan Rural District, in the Central District of Khamir County, Hormozgan Province, Iran. At the 2006 census, its population was 338, in 80 families.

References 

Populated places in Khamir County